Gary W. Berner is an American politician.

From 1987 to 1991, Gary Berner was a member of the Connecticut House of Representatives for the 10th district. Elected as a Republican, he succeeded Timothy Moynihan and was replaced by Rosemary Moynihan. Berner contested the 10th district seat in 1992, and lost to Melody Currey. After stepping down from the state legislature, Berner served as a legislative liaison for governors Jodi Rell and Dannel Malloy. Berner retired from public service in 2016.

References

Living people
Year of birth missing (living people)
20th-century American politicians
Republican Party members of the Connecticut House of Representatives